Afik is an Israeli settlement and a kibbutz in the Golan Heights.

Afik may also refer to:
Afik Nissim, Israeli professional basketball player
Hamkah Afik, Singapore sprinter